Richard Stevens was an American tennis player active in the late 19th century and early 20th century.

Stevens reached the quarterfinals of the U.S. National Championships six times: in 1892, 1893, 1894, 1896, 1898 and 1905. He won the Middle States Championships two years in a row in 1892 and 1893.

External links 

American male tennis players
Year of birth missing
Year of death missing